Rome and Jerusalem: The Last National Question is a book published by Moses Hess in 1862 in Leipzig. It gave impetus to the Labor Zionism movement. In his magnum opus, Hess argued for the Jews to return to Palestine, and proposed a socialist country in which the Jews would become agrarianised through a process of "redemption of the soil".

Importance

The book was the first Zionist writing to put the question of Jewish nationalism in the context of European nationalism. 

Hess blended secular as well as religious philosophy, Hegelian dialectics, Spinoza's pantheism and Marxism.

It was written against the background of German Jewish assimilationism, German antisemitism and German antipathy to nationalism arising in other countries. Hess used terminology of the day, such as the term "race", but he was an egalitarian who believed in the principles of the French Revolution, and wanted to apply the progressive concepts of his day to the Jewish people.

Major themes

Written in the form of twelve letters addressed to a woman in her grief at the loss of a relative. 
In his work, Hess put forward the following ideas:
 The Jews will always remain strangers among the European peoples, who may emancipate them for reasons of humanity and justice, but will never respect them so long as the Jews place their own great national memories in the background and hold to the principle, "Ubi bene, ibi patria." (Latin language: "where [it is] well, there [is] the fatherland")
 The Jewish type is indestructible, and Jewish national feeling can not be uprooted, although the German Jews, for the sake of a wider and more general emancipation, persuade themselves and others to the contrary. 
 If the emancipation of the Jews is irreconcilable with Jewish nationality, the Jews must sacrifice emancipation to nationality. Hess considers that the only solution of the Jewish question lies in the returning to Palestine.

Reactions and legacy

At the time the book was met with a cold reception, and only in retrospect it became one of the basic works of Zionism, as it prefigured ideas laid out in Der Judenstaat by Theodor Herzl by some 35 years.

References

Further reading
Rome and Jerusalem text in Wikisource
Shlomo Avineri, Moses Hess; Prophet of Communism and Zionism (New York, 1984).

1862 non-fiction books
Books about Zionism
Labor Zionism
Zionism
Jewish German history
National questions